El Houari Mohammed Ben Brahim Assarraj (1897–1955) was a poet from Morocco. He is especially well known as the poet of Marrakech of the first part of the 20th century. He wrote poems for both king Mohammed V and for his opponent El Glaoui.

According to his biographer Omar Mounir he was "considered a nationalist by the French, a traitor by the nationalists, a alem by the man in the street and a rascal by the ulemas." Mohamed Ben Brahim studied at the Ibn Yousouf University in Marrakech and the Al-Qarawiyyin University of Fes. He worked as a university professor for a short period and, after that as a journalist.

Many of Ben Brahim's poems are put to music and still popular in present-day Morocco. Karima Skalli is one of his work's interpreters.

Mehdi Khayat interprets Ben Brahim's poetry in his musical work, titled "Mehdi Khayat and the poet of Marrakech"

Bibliography
Omar Mounir, Le Poète de Marrakech (=Shair Al-Hamra),  Editions La Porte, Rabat, 2001. 
Ben Brahim, Mohammed (1949). “Ilayka Ya Ni Ma Sadiq”(To you my dear friend). Tetuan, Morocco: Hassania Publishing Company
Ahmed Cherkaoui-Ikbal, Le poète de Marrakech sous les tamis (1958)
Abdelkrim Ghallab, L'Univers du Poète de Marrakech (1982)
Ahmed al Khoulassa, Le Poète de Marrakech dans l'histoire de la littérature contemporaine (1987)

References

External links
Said Hajji.com: fragments from the journal Al Maghrib no. 396 (1940)  (translated in English)
Bouchra Lahbabi, "Maoussimyyat : hommage à Ben Brahim, poète de Marrakech", Le Matin, 28 - 10 - 2001  (retrieved 15-7-2012)
maroc-hebdo.press: Un poète chez les hommes (second article)  (in French)

20th-century Moroccan poets
1897 births
1955 deaths
People from Marrakesh
19th-century Moroccan people
20th-century poets